The Miranzai Valley Expeditions were two British-Indian military expeditions to the North-West Frontier Province in Pakistan.

References

Military expeditions
Karlani Pashtun tribes
North-West Frontier Province